Ghost Doctor ( is a 2022 South Korean television series directed by Boo Seong-cheol and starring Rain, Kim Bum, Uee, and Son Na-eun. The series revolves around two doctors from extreme backgrounds and skills merging into one person. It aired from January 3 to February 22, 2022, on tvN's Mondays and Tuesdays at 22:30 (KST) time slot for 16 episodes. It is available for streaming on TVING,  iQiyi, and Netflix.

Synopsis
The series revolves around two doctors from extreme backgrounds, who have complete opposite personalities and medical skills: Cha Young-min (Rain) is a genius doctor and a high-skilled cardiothoracic surgeon, but is arrogant and selfish. Go Seung-tak (Kim-Bum), who although possesses excellent medical knowledge, is hindered by his fear of blood. One day, Young Min gets involved in an unexpected case, and due to this, his spirit possesses Seung-tak's body.

Cast and characters

Main 
 Rain as Cha Young-min: 38 years old, a genius cardiothoracic surgeon who has a golden hand, he can handle the difficult surgeries and is the best doctor of Eunsang Foundation Hospital.
 Kim Bum as Go Seung-tak: 28 years old, 1st year thoracic surgery resident, a "silver spoon" resident in the hospital as his grandfather is the founder of the hospital, and his mother is the current chairman of the foundation. He has excellent theoretical knowledge but practically clumsy at work.
 Uee as Jang Se-jin: 38 years old, Cha Young-min's love interest and an overseas and genius neurosurgeon, she was raised as daughter of a single mother.
 Son Na-eun as Oh Soo-jeong: 28 years old, a highly talented emergency room intern, straight forward at work and wants to be a cardiothoracic surgeon, Go Seung-tak's best friend and love interest. Granddaughter of Oh Joo-Myung, which after his death becomes the ghost, Tes.

Supporting 
 Sung Dong-il as Tes/Oh Joo-myung: a genius and compassionate cardiothoracic surgeon before his death in the age of 60s. Twenty years after his death, he still wanders in the hospital as a ghost, helping the patients by possessing the hospital staffs, including Cha Young-min while in his residency.

Hospital people
 Tae In-ho as Han Seung-won: in mid 30's, Executive Director, Go Seung-tak's older cousin. He is a two-faced man with an invisible dagger inside, main antagonist.
 Park Chul-min as Ban Tae-sik: in early 50's. Chief of Thoracic Surgery. In front of other doctors, he shouts "I was a genius in my old days", but in front of  Cha Young-min, he always gets smaller.
 Ko Sang-ho as Ahn Tae-hyun: 34 years old, 4th year as a thoracic surgery fellow and a loyal junior of Cha Young-min who betrayed him after getting bribed by Jang Min ho
 Ahn Tae-hwan as Kim Jae-won: 29 years old, a third year cardiothoracic surgeon, who has a simple and clear personality. A kind and warm person who values every little life, likes Go Seung-tak.
 Kim Jae-yong as Lee Seon-ho: 30 years old. 4th year thoracic surgery resident, he is born and raised in a middle-class family
 Seo Ji-young as Go Seong-hye: chairman of the Medical Foundation
Choi Seok-won as Hun-gil: a coma ghost who dreams of becoming an actor, Bo-mi’s love interest
 Yoon So-hee as Im Bo-mi: a coma ghost who feels pressured by her mother to be a professor, Hun-gil’s love interest
 Han Seung-hyun as Hwang Guk-chan: a coma ghost whose family owns a walnut cookie shop
 Yoon Da-kyung as Seong Mi-ran: Go Seung-tak's mother. A person with two sides: a kind mother for Seung-tak and a cold-hearted and stubborn president of a medical foundation.
 Hwang Seok-jeong as Mrs. Kim: hospital's custodian. She has unique ability to meet various people in the hospital.
 Park So-eun as Nurse Jung
Shin Soo-hang as emergency room doctor.
Kim Jung-hwan as doctor.
Baek Ik-nam as doctor (ep. 1).
Jeon Se-yong as internship interviewer (ep. 1).
Bae Ki-bum as OR anesthesiologist (ep. 1).

Others
 Lee Tae-sung as Jang Min-ho: in early 40's, son of Chairman Jang Myung-duk, he is a cold-blooded man who takes advantage of his father's illness to become the heir to the group.
Lee Moon-soo as Chairman Jang Kwang-deok: 70 years old, Chairman of the Chunmyung group, has cardiac sarcoma and is in need of surgery.
 Woo Yong-hee as paramedic (ep. 1)
 Park Sung-kyun as medical school professor (ep. 1)
 Kim Woo-jin as paramedic (ep. 1)
 Lee Kyu-hyun as mysterious motorcycle man
 Kim Jung-woon as Jang Min-ho's secretary
 Sugar Glider as Cha Mandu

Special Appearance 
 Ahn Hee-yeon as Lee Ji-woo/ Jessica

Production
On March 17, 2021 it was reported that Rain will make a comeback with TV series Ghost Doctor, directed by Bu Seong-cheol, written by Kim Seon-sun, and produced by Bone Factory. He last appeared in 2019 series Welcome 2 Life. The cast lineup was confirmed on November 8, 2021. On November 2, Son Na-eun posted a photo from the filming site.

On February 6, 2022, it was reported that filming had been completed.

Original soundtrack

Part 1

Part 2

Part 3

Part 4

Part 5

Viewership

Accolades

References

External links
  
 Ghost Doctor at Daum 
  Ghost Doctor at Naver 
 
 
 

TVN (South Korean TV channel) television dramas
2022 South Korean television series debuts
2022 South Korean television series endings
Korean-language television shows
South Korean fantasy television series
South Korean medical television series
Television series by Bon Factory Worldwide